Howard Deering Johnson (February 2, 1897 – June 20, 1972) was an American entrepreneur, businessman, and the founder of an American chain of restaurants and motels under one company of the same name, Howard Johnson's.

Early life
Howard Johnson was born in Boston, Massachusetts, and only finished elementary school because he began to work in his father's cigar business. He served during World War I in the American Expeditionary Force in France. His father died and left him a business that was in debt. He ran the cigar store until 1924 when he liquidated it, but he could not erase the $10,000 debt. He entered the restaurant industry to pay off the loan that remained after he sold the cigar venture.

In 1925, he bought a small soda shop in the Wollaston neighborhood of Quincy, Massachusetts. He enhanced the quality of the ice cream by buying a recipe from a pushcart vendor for $300. It doubled the butterfat of the product and used only natural flavorings. He used hand-cranked makers in his basement and by 1928 was grossing about $240,000 from ice cream sold in the store and nearby beaches.

Johnson expanded operations by opening more stores and started selling food items such as hamburgers and frankfurters at his original store. In 1929, he opened a second restaurant in Quincy. This sit-down outlet had a broader menu and laid the groundwork for future expansion.

In 1935, Howard Johnson teamed up with a local businessman, Reginald Sprague, and created the first modern restaurant franchise. The idea was new in that era: let an operator use the name, food, supplies, and logo, in exchange for a fee. The business of "HoJo" chain restaurants rapidly expanded, and he also entered the lodging industry.

Howard Johnson had his two children began working in the business. His son Howard Brennan Johnson (b. 1933) and daughter Dorothy Johnson (1930-2013) beamed down together from highway billboards proclaiming that "We love our daddy's ice cream" at the time when they were six and eight years old respectively.

Later life
Johnson was married four times (Dorothy Frances Smith m. 1928 and d. 1930 and Marjorie Christine Smith m. 1949), fathering at least two children. He had a 60-foot (18 m) yacht and collected paintings. His hobby was "to talk and eat food." His favorite food was ice cream, which he stoutly — he was  — maintained was "not fattening." He ate at least a cone a day, and he kept 10 distinct flavors in the freezers of his seven-room Manhattan penthouse and at his home in Milton, Massachusetts.

In later life, Johnson recalled that he had no interest in or time for anything but building his business. "I think that [building the business] was my only form of recreation," Joseph H. Boyett quoted him as having said. The author of a book entitled The guru guide to entrepreneurship also recited "I never played golf. I never played tennis. I never did anything after I left school. I ate, slept, and thought of nothing but the business."

Johnson retired in 1959, leaving the company to his son, Howard Brennan ("Bud") Johnson. The older Johnson continued to monitor his restaurants for cleanliness and proper food preparation. He would be chauffeured in a black Cadillac bearing the license plate HJ-28 (his initials and 28 ice cream flavors) while performing unannounced inspections of the restaurants.

Johnson died on June 20, 1972, at the age of 75. He was buried in Milton Cemetery in Milton, Massachusetts. His son sold the family business in 1979 and left in 1981.

Legacy
Johnson's contribution to the restaurant industry was the idea of centralized buying and a commissary system to prepare menu items for distribution to the chain of restaurants. He helped shape the "American way of dining out" that included locations by major roads, family-friendly atmosphere, and preparing comfort food meals. These innovations helped to ensure uniform consistency and quality, as well as lower costs; however, the firm's cost-cutting focus and new competitors contributed to the eventual failure of the large restaurant chain that Johnson developed. The company was at one time the largest commercial food supplier and lodging operator in the United States.

In 1999, Johnson was inducted into the Hospitality Industry Hall of Honor, which recognizes the world's most successful hospitality interests and most recognizable brands.

References

Further reading

External links 

1897 births
1972 deaths
American hoteliers
American restaurateurs
Fast-food chain founders
People from Quincy, Massachusetts
People from Milton, Massachusetts
Howard Johnson's
Businesspeople from Massachusetts
20th-century American businesspeople